

Events

By month

February events 
 February 27
  – Official opening of Santo Domingo Metro.
  – National Express changes the name of the railway operating company one to National Express East Anglia as part of a company-wide rebranding exercise.

March events 
  March 9 – Sprinter starts service between Oceanside and Escondido, California, reinstating passenger service on the Escondido branch line.
  March 15 – The Osaka Higashi Line is scheduled to open in Osaka, Japan; the opening was originally scheduled for 2006, but delayed due to problems acquiring land.
  March 27 – Heathrow Terminal 5 station opens in London.
  March 30 – Yokohama Municipal Subway's Green Line is opened for regular operations.
  – Kolkata Metro is extended from Tollygunge station to Pranabnagar station.

April events 
  April 1 – The Miki Railway Miki Line in Japan, which connected Yakujin Station in Kakogawa and Miki Station in Miki, is closed.
  April 26 – FrontRunner, a new commuter rail service, begins running in Utah.
  April 28 – Wrexham & Shropshire begin to run passenger services between London Marylebone station, the West Midlands, Shropshire and north-east Wales.

June events 
  June 2 – An unexploded bomb from World War II is found near where the District and Hammersmith & City lines cross the Prescott Channel, not far from Bromley-by-Bow tube station, causing disruption to trains.
 June 2–6 – AfricaRail 2008 Conference.

July events 
  July 5 – Meeting between Venezuela, Colombia and Ecuador regarding a proposed rail link for freight and passengers between the three countries, also connecting the Pacific with the Atlantic.

August events 
 August 1
  – LNER-design Peppercorn Class A1 60163 Tornado makes first official move under its own steam, the first main line steam locomotive built in Britain since 1960.

November events 
  November – Voter approval of Measure M in Los Angeles County, California, commits additional tax dollars to transit projects.

December events 
  December 27 – The first section of the new Valley Metro Rail system, part of Valley Metro in Phoenix, Arizona, opened.

By season

Summer events 
  – The project to rebuild and upgrade Guiyang Southern Station to more than double its capacity is expected to be completed.

Unknown date events

  – Indian Railways expects to complete the conversion of its electrified section in Mumbai from a 1,500 volt DC system to 25,000 volts AC; this will make the Mumbai section's electrification consistent with the rest of Indian Railways' network.
  – Vietnam expects to complete construction on the Hanoi–Lào Cai railway line upgrade.
  – The city of Saint Petersburg, Russia, will begin construction of a new intercity light railway beginning with a  section between Baltiyskaya Zhemchuzhina and the Obukhovo metro station.

Accidents
  April 28 – 2008 Shandong train collision: Sixty-six people are killed and almost 250 injured when a passenger train from Beijing careers off the rails and slams into another train in eastern China. The rail accident, the worst in China in more than a decade, happens near the city of Zibo in Shandong province.
  August 8 – 2008 Studénka train wreck: A EuroCity train en route to Prague strikes a part of a motorway bridge that has fallen onto the track near Studénka station and derails, killing 8 people and injuring 64 others.
  September 12 – 2008 Chatsworth train collision: A Metrolink commuter train, having passed a signal at danger, collides head-on into a Union Pacific freight train in Los Angeles, killing 25 and injuring 130.

Deaths

March deaths 
 March 16 – John Shedd Reed, president of Atchison, Topeka and Santa Fe Railway 1967-1986 (born 1917).

Industry awards

Japan 
 Awards presented by the Japan Railfan Club
 2008 Blue Ribbon Award: JR Central & JR West N700 Series Shinkansen
 2008 Laurel Prize: JR East/Sendai Airport Transit E721 series/SAT721 EMU and JR East KiHa E200 DMU

References